20th Century Blues is the fifteenth studio album by Robin Trower.

Track listing
All songs written by Robin Trower, except "Reconsider Baby".

Personnel
Robin Trower – guitar
Livingstone Brown – bass, vocals, keyboards
Mayuyu – drums

Album cover
This was the sixth album cover created by Paul Olsen. When asked to create a cover for the album, Paul presented transparencies of a batch of paintings, intending for the photos to be a starting point. However, Robin picked a specific one that he wanted. Afterwards, Paul researched the original design, and discovered he had actually created the basic design in 1974, yet had not painted it until 1990. Ironically, it was originally an alternative he had done for the Long Misty Days cover, but had never shown to Robin because he preferred the autumn leaf design. Therefore, Robin had unknowingly selected a design that was meant for him almost twenty years earlier.

References 
Source – Album liner notes.

External links 
 TrowerPower.com – Official website

1994 albums
Robin Trower albums